The white-winged robin (Peneothello sigillata) is a species of bird in the family Petroicidae.

Distribution and habitat
The white-winged robin is found in New Guinea. Its natural habitat is subtropical or tropical moist montane forests.

Description
Measuring , the adult white-winged robin has black plumage, with largely white wings. The male and female are identical. The bill and feet are black, and the eyes are dark brown. Juveniles have a variable streaked brown plumage.

Behaviour
Within the forest the robin is found in pairs or small troops of several birds in the understory or on the ground. It is insectivorous, but does also eat some seeds.  The somewhat bulky cup-shaped nest is constructed in a tree fork.

Taxonomy
Described by English naturalist, Charles Walter De Vis, in 1890, the white-winged robin is a member of the Australasian robin family Petroicidae. Sibley and Ahlquist's DNA-DNA hybridisation studies placed this group in a Corvida parvorder comprising many tropical and Australian passerines, including pardalotes, fairy-wrens, honeyeaters, and crows. However, subsequent molecular research (and current consensus) places the robins as a very early offshoot of the Passerida (or "advanced" songbirds) within the songbird lineage.

Subspecies
Within the species, three subspecies are recognised—the nominate subspecies, which is found on the main mountain range along New Guinea from the Bismarck Range eastwards, subspecies hagenensis from Mount Hagen west into Irian Jaya, and subspecies saruwagedi of the Huon Peninsula.

References

white-winged robin
white-winged robin
Taxonomy articles created by Polbot